The 2023 Wake Forest Demon Deacons football team will represent Wake Forest University as a member of the Atlantic Coast Conference (ACC) during the 2023 NCAA Division I FBS football season. The Demon Deacons are expected to be led by Dave Clawson in his tenth year as head coach. They play their home games at Truist Field in Winston-Salem, North Carolina.

Previous season 

The Demon Deacons finished with an 8-5 record (3-5 ACC). They won the Gasparilla Bowl with a score of 27-17 against Missouri. Although they started out 6-1 with only a narrow 51-45 loss to #5 Clemson in double overtime, they lost 4 of their last 5 games.

Offseason

Players drafted into the NFL

Transfers

Outgoing

Incoming

Schedule
Wake Forest and the ACC announced the 2023 football schedule on January 30, 2023. The 2023 season will be the conference's first season since 2004, that its scheduling format just includes one division. The new format sets Wake Forest with three set conference opponents, while playing the remaining ten teams twice in an (home and away) in a four–year cycle. The Demon Deacons three set conference opponents for the next four years is; Duke, Georgia Tech, and Virginia Tech.

Game summaries

Elon

Vanderbilt

References

Wake Forest
Wake Forest Demon Deacons football seasons
Wake Forest Demon Deacons football